DR, Dr, dr, or variation, may refer to:

 Doctor (title), a person who has obtained a doctoral degree or a courtesy title for a medical or dental practitioner

Businesses
 DR Handmade Strings, a manufacturer of guitar strings
 DR (broadcaster), a Danish government-owned radio and television public broadcasting company
 D/R or Design Research, a retail lifestyle store chain (1953–1978)
 DR Motor Company, an Italian automobile company
 Depositary receipt, negotiable financial instrument issued by a bank to represent a foreign company's publicly traded securities
 Deutsche Reichsbahn (East Germany), former German railway company
 Digital Research, a defunct software company
 Duane Reade, a New York pharmacy chain
 Ruili Airlines (IATA code DR), a Chinese airline

Places
 Dominican Republic, a country on the eastern portion of the Caribbean island of Hispaniola
 Dadar railway station, Mumbai, India (Central railway station code)

Science and technology
 Dead reckoning, the process of estimating a global position
 Demand response, a method of managing consumer consumption of electricity
 Disaster recovery, secondary site to switchover or failover to if the primary site does not survive
 Designated Router, a concept used in routing protocol OSPF
 Design rationale, an explicit documentation of the reasons behind decisions made when designing a system or artifact
 Digital radiography, a form of x-ray imaging, where digital X-ray sensors are used instead of traditional photographic film
 Dram, a unit of mass and volume
 Dynamic range, the ratio between the largest and smallest possible values of a changeable quantity, such as ind sound and light
 Dose–response relationship, describes the change in effect on an organism caused by differing levels of exposure
 Dreieckrechner, a German flight computer manufactured as of the 1930s (model DR2) and the 1940s (model DR3)

Other uses
 Dalereckoning, a fictional numbering of years in the Forgotten Realms campaign setting of the Dungeons & Dragons game
 Data Room, a space used for housing data, usually of a secure or privileged nature
 Death row, a prison or section of a prison that houses prisoners awaiting execution
 Democratic Republic, designating a country that is both a democracy and a republic
 Derealization, an alteration in the perception of the external world such that it seems unreal
 Diário da República, the official gazette of the government of Portugal
 Disaster recovery, policies, tools and procedures for recovering IT or technology systems supporting critical business functions
 Douay–Rheims Bible, a translation of the Christian Bible
 Danganronpa, a video game series and anime commonly known by this name by fans.
 Dress rehearsal (disambiguation),  a full-scale rehearsal where the actors and/or musicians perform every detail of the performance prior to its first public performance 
 Diminishing returns 
 Deltarune, a game by Toby Fox

See also

 Digital recorder (disambiguation)
 Doctor (disambiguation)
 
 
 RD (disambiguation)